The South African Army Support Formation supports and provides sustainment services to all South African Army units.

Structure

References

Logistics units and formations of the South African Army